Steven William Umboh, also known as Steven William or Stefan William (born 11 August 1993), is an Indonesian actor and singer. He is known for his roles in the soap operas Anak Jalanan and Anak Langit as well as the film Bestfriend? William is the vocalist of the Indonesian band The Junas Monkey (later shortened to The Junas), with whom he has released several singles and one EP. He is married to actress and singer Celine Evangelista.

Biography

Personal life
Umboh is the first son of Indonesian Ellen Thelma Umboh and American Clinton Avery and has a younger sister named Jennifer Avery. He was born in the United States and moved to Indonesia at the age of six. He is also the grandson of Indonesian director Wim Umboh. William married actress and singer  on 10 November 2016.

Career
William made a name for himself on Indonesian screens with roles in the soap operas Anak Jalanan, Boy, and Anak Langit. He has also appeared in several feature films, including Bestfriend? (2008) and Putih Abu-Abu dan Sepatu Kets (2009).

In 2011, William began singing with the band The Junas Monkey, which also included actors Ajun Perwira on guitar, Aditya Suryo on drums, and Bobie Antonio on bass. They released several singles and a self-titled EP, before going on an extended hiatus. In 2020, The Junas Monkey made a comeback under the shortened name The Junas.

Filmography

The Junas Monkey discography
EPs
 The Junas Monkey (2012)

Singles
 "Jadian" (2011)
 "Ikut Aku" (feat. Icha Anisa – 2012)
 "Karena Cinta" (2018)
 "Cukup Dikenang Saja" (feat. Yasmin Napper – 2020)
 "I Love You Baby" (2020)

Awards and nominations

References

External links
 
 Actor profile on Profipedia
 The Junas Monkey on Facebook

1993 births
Living people
Indo people
Minahasa people
Indonesian male film actors
American emigrants to Indonesia
American people of Indonesian descent
Indonesian Christians
21st-century Indonesian male singers